Florante Condes, Jr. (born May 20, 1980 in Looc, Romblon, Philippines), is a Filipino retired professional boxer and a former IBF Minimumweight World Champion.

Boxing career
Condes turned professional in 2002.  On July 7, 2007, Condes won the IBF minimumweight title by a split decision victory over Muhammad Rachman. There, he knocked Rachman down twice (once in the 3rd round and again in the 10th). The bout was held in the studio of the private RCTI television station in Jakarta, Indonesia.  Salven Lagumbay of the Philippines and Montol Suriyachand of Thailand, scored it 114-112 for Condes, while the home judge Muhammad Rois gave it 114-112 for Rachman.

Condes and Nonito Donaire have made it to the prestigious Ring Magazine rankings (July 9). The bible of boxing put Donaire at no. 1 spot in the flyweight division (112 pounds). Condes, on the other hand, is at third in the straw weight division (105 lbs).

After 11 months and 6 days of inactivity, Condes finally got the chance to defend his title. Unfortunately, he (22-4-1) lost his title on to undefeated Mexican Raul Garcia (23-0-1) via twelve-round split decision (scores 112-115, 115-112, 118-110) in La Paz, Mexico, despite scoring a knockdown in the final round.

He attempted to gain another shot at the title he lost to Garcia by facing Nkosinathi Joyi in an eliminator on June 26, 2009. Condes, however, was downed in the 11th as well as losing the match by unanimous decision.

Troubled career
Condes' rising career became a nightmare when it was revealed that his registered manager wasn't actually Aljoe Jaro but Jaro's wife. Also, he has not yet claimed a $10,000 bonus from American promoters, through his supposed manager promised him. Because of these issues, Condes said in an interview that his career may come to end.

See also
 List of Filipino boxing world champions

References

External links
 

1980 births
Living people
Sportspeople from Romblon
International Boxing Federation champions
Mini-flyweight boxers
World mini-flyweight boxing champions
Filipino male boxers